"Voilà" is a song by French singer Barbara Pravi. It was released for digital download and to streaming platforms on 6 November 2020 and is co-composed by Barbara Pravi, Igit and Lili Poe. The song represented France in the Eurovision Song Contest 2021 in Rotterdam, the Netherlands, placing second, after winning the pre-selection competition Eurovision France, c'est vous qui décidez! The single was certified Platinum (Global) in August 2021 and Gold (France) in April 2022. The song tells a personal story of Pravi's about self-acceptance.

Eurovision Song Contest

The song represented France in the Eurovision Song Contest 2021, after it was chosen through Eurovision France, c'est vous qui décidez! She advanced from the first round. She went on to compete in the final, winning the jury and televote, amassing enough points to win the competition. As France is a member of the "Big Five", the song automatically advanced to the final, which was held on 22 May 2021 at the Rotterdam Ahoy in Rotterdam, Netherlands. In the final, the song placed second with 499 points, France's best result in the contest since 1991.

Personnel
Credits adapted from Tidal.
 Barbara Pravi – producer, composer, lyricist, associated performer, vocals
 Elodie Filleul – producer
 Jérémie Arcache – producer
 Igit – composer
 Lili Poe – composer

Charts

Certifications

Release history

References

2020 songs
2020 singles
Capitol Records singles
Eurovision songs of 2021
Eurovision songs of France
Songs written by Barbara Pravi